Admiral Sir John Gore, KCB (9 February 1772, County Kilkenny, Ireland – 21 August 1836, Datchet, Buckinghamshire) was a British naval commander of the 18th and 19th centuries.  His father was Colonel John Gore.

Naval career 
Gore joined the Royal Navy in August 1781, as a captain's servant, and would have served as a midshipman, before gaining promotion to lieutenant on 26 November 1789 and commander on 24 May 1794. The Royal Navy had just captured the French corvette Fleche at the capture of Bastia, in which Gore had played a significant role and had been injured. The Navy took the corvette into service as HMS Fleche and commissioned her under Gore. He fitted her out and sailed her to Malta where he negotiated with the Grand Master of the Knights Hospitaller Emmanuel de Rohan-Polduc for seamen, supplies, and the like. On 13 September Gore was a witness at the trial of Lieutenant William Walker, commander of the hired armed cutter Rose, on charges that Walker had accepted money from merchants at Bastia to convoy their vessels to Leghorn, where the court martial took place. Walker was acquitted.

Gore received promotion to post captain on 14 November 1794. While commanding the 32-gun frigate HMS Medusa, he took part in the action of 5 October 1804. Promoted to rear-admiral on 4 December 1813, he became Commander-in-Chief, The Nore from 1818 to 1821. Promoted to vice-admiral on 27 May 1825, he served as Commander-in-Chief, East Indies and China Station from 1831 to 1834.

Family 
On 15 August 1808, at St George's, Hanover Square, he married Georgiana Montagu, daughter of Admiral Sir George Montagu and Charlotte Wroughton.  The couple had four children:
Lieutenant John Gore (d. 1835)
Hon. Georgiana Stuart Gore (d. 18 July 1877)
Anne Gore (d. 23 July 1877) – the mother of Assheton Gore Curzon-Howe.
Maria Gore (d. 8 March 1902)

Popular Culture 

In fiction, he appears in CS Forester's Hornblower and the Hotspur and in MC Muir's Admiralty Orders as the Medusa's captain. In the latter book the action of 5 October 1804 is described.

See also 
 European and American voyages of scientific exploration

References 

 

|-

Royal Navy admirals
Royal Navy personnel of the French Revolutionary Wars
British naval commanders of the Napoleonic Wars
People from County Kilkenny
Knights Commander of the Order of the Bath
1772 births
1836 deaths